"Cry in Shame" is a song by Australian rock group, Johnny Diesel and the Injectors. The song was released as the band's third single from their debut album Johnny Diesel and the Injectors in April 1989 and peaked at 10 in Australia, becoming the band's third top 10 single.

Track listing
7" single
 "Cry in Shame" (Edited Version)
 "Dry Tears"

12" vinyl
 "Cry in Shame" (Edited Version)
 "Dry Tears"
 "Comin' Home" (Live)
 "Leave My Girl Alone" (Live)

Charts
"Cry in Shame" debuted at number 39 in Australia in April 1989, before peaking at number 10 in May.

Weekly charts

Year-end charts

Credits
 Producer, engineer, mixing – Terry Manning
 Bass – Johnny "Tatt" Dalzell
 Drums – Yak Sherrit
 Guitar, vocals – Johnny Diesel
 Saxophone, backing vocals – Bernie Bremond

External links

References

Chrysalis Records singles
1989 singles
1988 songs
Diesel (musician) songs
Songs written by Diesel (musician)
Song recordings produced by Terry Manning